Mantripalem is a village in Nagaram Mandal, Guntur district, Andhra Pradesh, India.

Villages in Guntur district